Peter Karlsson may refer to: 
* Peter Karlsson (ice hockey) (1966–1995), Swedish ice hockey player
 Peter Karlsson (speedway rider) (born 1969), Swedish motorcycle speedway rider
 Peter Karlsson (table tennis) (born 1969), Swedish table tennis player
 Peter Karlsson (athlete) (born 1970), Swedish sprinter
 Peter Karlsson (footballer, born 1961), Swedish footballer
 Peter Karlsson (footballer, born 1973), Swedish footballer

See also